Slobodka is a rural locality (a village) in Mstyora Urban Settlement, Vyaznikovsky District, Vladimir Oblast, Russia. The population was 69 as of 2010.

Geography 
Slobodka is located 21 km northwest of Vyazniki (the district's administrative centre) by road. Novosyolka is the nearest rural locality.

References 

Rural localities in Vyaznikovsky District